Babul Phukan (1 May 1968 – 14 December 2013) was a former Indian footballer from Assam.

Playing career

Early career
Born at Chakalibhoria village near Panitola in Tinsukia district of Assam, Phukan came from a football family. His elder brothers Reboti Phukan, Sada Phukan and Rudra Phukan all are state level footballers. In 1982, he started his junior career by representing Assam State Sub Junior team. In that year Assam was the Runners-up in the National Sub Junior Football tournament. After his good performances, he was selected for Assam Junior team in 1984. He represented Assam football team nine times in the Santosh Trophy. He was the captain of Assam state team in 1989 and 1990.

Club career
Phukan played for Maharana Athletic Club, one of the oldest club in North-East from 1985 to 1988. In 1989, he played for Mohammedan Sporting Club in Calcutta for one season. In 1990, he joined the Gauhati Town Club. In 1994, Phukan back to his old club Maharana Athletic Club and played there from 1994 to 1998.

International career
In 1985, he represented the India U23 team against Italy in Delhi and Lucknow. In the same year he was selected in senior India national football team and made his  International debut for India national football team in Nepal. In 1985–86, he was again picked for the Indian junior team for the matches which played in Pakistan and Riyadh. In 1988, he played for the SAI team against a Russian team in Guwahati and Shillong. He put up brilliant performances in those matches.

In 2000, he retired from professional football.

Death
Phukan who was also an SBI Officer died on 14 December 2013 in a private hospital in Guwahati at the age of 49 years. He was suffering from liver related disease from a long period of time. Former CM of Assam Tarun Gogoi quoted him as, "Phukan with his stylish footwork techniques and sportsmanship would remain an example for the new generation of footballers".

References

Indian footballers
1968 births
Footballers from Assam
Association football defenders
India international footballers
Mohammedan SC (Kolkata) players
Gauhati Town Club players
People from Tinsukia district
2013 deaths